Hatter's Castle is a 1942 British film noir based on the 1931 novel Hatter's Castle by A. J. Cronin, which dramatizes the ruin that befalls a Scottish hatter set on recapturing his imagined lost nobility. The film was made by Paramount British Pictures and stars Robert Newton, Deborah Kerr, James Mason, and Emlyn Williams. It is believed to be the only film that depicts the Tay Bridge disaster.

It was shot at Denham Studios with sets designed by the art director James A. Carter.

Cast
 Robert Newton as James Brodie
 Deborah Kerr as Mary Brodie
 James Mason as Dr. Renwick
 Emlyn Williams as Dennis
 Henry Oscar as Grierson
 Enid Stamp-Taylor as Nancy
 Beatrice Varley as Mrs. Brodie
 Anthony Bateman as Angus Brodie
 June Holden as Janet
 George Merritt as Gibson
 Laurence Hanray as Dr. Lawrie
 Claude Bailey as Paxton
 Ian Fleming as Sir John Latta 
 Mary Hinton as Lady Winton 
 Roddy Hughes as Gordon
 David Keir as Perry 
 Stuart Lindsell as Lord Winton 
 Aubrey Mallalieu as Clergyman 
 Brefni O'Rorke as Foyle 
 Vi Kaley as Old Lady In 'The Winton Arms'
 John Slater as Card Player
 Robert Brooks Turner as Engine Driver

Box Office
The film was a surprise hit. According to Kinematograph Weekly the film was one of the most popular at the British box office in 1942, after Mrs Miniver, First of the Few, How Green was My Valley, Reap the Wild Wind, Holiday Inn, Captains of the Clouds, Sergeant York, One of Our Air Craft is Missing and before Young Mr Pitt.

Critical reception
Variety wrote, "Here is a film, if ever there was one, that is best indicative of one player’s superlative performance. The player, Robert Newton, disregards tradition and enacts the featured male role without bombast or any sort of vocal pyrotechnics. There is little in the picturized version of A.J. Cronin’s bestseller that is not already stale and the plot travels along stereotyped lines to an obvious conclusion. It is, however, artistically produced, photographed and acted...The leading lady is Deborah Kerr, lovable and sincere as the daughter; the juvenile lead of Doctor Renwick is restrainedly played by James Mason." while more recently, Time Out called it "An entertaining slice of Victorian melodrama adapted from AJ Cronin's novel. Not quite Gothic, but edging that way through Newton's performance (one of his more controlled efforts) as the social-climbing Glasgow hatter...Damped down by flat direction, but the sets and camerawork are excellent."

References

External links
 
 Film synopsis and images
 
 Noir of the Week blog
 

1942 films
1940s historical drama films
British disaster films
British historical drama films
Films shot at Denham Film Studios
Disaster films based on actual events
Film noir
Films about dysfunctional families
Films about suicide
Films based on British novels
Films based on works by A. J. Cronin
Films directed by Lance Comfort
Films set in Scotland
Films set in the 19th century
Films shot in England
Paramount Pictures films
British black-and-white films
1940s disaster films
1942 drama films
1940s English-language films
1940s British films